Magicite is an action-adventure roguelike game developed by SmashGames. Up to four players fight through randomly generated dungeons, gathering items and crafting equipment.  The game was released on Steam in early-access on February 11, 2014, and left early-access on June 9, 2014. It was funded through a Kickstarter campaign.

References

Roguelike video games